Christopher T. Gonzalez, also known as Chris Gonzalez, was an activist who succumbed to AIDS on May 5, 1994, in Indianapolis. He left a legacy for gay and lesbian youth in and around the Indianapolis area that continues through the non-profit organization he founded, Indiana Youth Group (IYG). IYG was one of the first organizations in the country to support gay, lesbian, bisexual, and transgender youth.

Early life
Chris was born October 28, 1963 and grew up as the typical model student in Griffith, Indiana. Always a well-spoken and well-liked student, he served as student council president at Griffith High School and was the voice behind morning announcements over the loud speaker heard all over the school. He even dated a pretty pompon girl at one time. However, like so many same gender loving teenagers, Chris was leading a double life in order to cover up who he was inside. Chris was ashamed of his homosexuality and felt like he had to prove to others that he was worthy. He did not want to be a homosexual because he was quite aware of society's small-minded opinions and misconceptions of same gender loving people.

He grew up in Lake County in a "very traditional Hispanic family" As a member of the Hispanic community, he felt his family would disown him if they ever found out he preferred boys over girls. He pursued his gay identity while still a student at Franklin College of Indiana where he was an active member of the Sigma Alpha Epsilon fraternity and a journalism major.

Self-revelation and self-acceptance
Gonzalez met his life partner Jeff Werner at Franklin College, located in Franklin, Indiana, and by the time he completed his degree, "he came to terms with the fact that he was among the 10 to 15 percent of the population who are homosexual, and thus, learned to accept and like himself." Gonzalez came out to his parents and much to his surprise, his Catholic father and his very religious mother accepted him unconditionally.

Still, he was well aware of the dismal plight of gay and lesbian youth.

Chris addressed these issues by becoming a volunteer counselor for the Gay/Lesbian Switchboard in Indianapolis. During those early years, (the 1980s), the hotline was the sole link to teens who were grappling with their sexuality, peer pressure, sexual identity, parents and family issues, etc. Through calls from a mass number of lonely and isolated youth it quickly became apparent to him that support was needed. The chilling calls reminded Gonzalez of his own journey and he was unwilling to let the gay and lesbian-identified adolescents remain "stuck in a self-hatred kind of place."

Creation of Indiana Youth Group
Founded in 1987 as a response to the needs of self-identified Lesbian, Gay, Bisexual, Transgender or Questioning youth, Indiana Youth Group (formerly known as Indianapolis Youth Group) held its first meeting in the living room of founders, Chris Gonzalez and Jeff Werner with support from Pat Jordan. After five years of operation, IYG was named a Special Projects of National Significance for its programs protecting the mental and physical health of Indiana's LGBT youth. For years, IYG operated an activity and program facility donated by the Health Foundation of Greater Indianapolis, which was renovated and maintained by community supporters. After fully appreciating and utilizing every square inch of that homelike space, IYG now occupies a 15,000 square foot Activity Center with room for large, medium and small groups, a spacious kitchen, education, art, and transitional apparel rooms. Youth with basic needs can access the pantry, showers, and laundry machines.
Nationally recognized as the first nonprofit organization in the country specifically dedicated to gay and lesbian youth issues, IYG has garnered countless awards, grants, and state funding. In 1992, it was featured on ABC News program 20/20. IYG continues to operate the activity center and provides support groups and workshops on a variety of topics. Additionally, IYG fosters working relationships with high schools around the state to form and support Gay–straight alliances.

Legacy
Gonzalez was a person who fought for the rights of LGBT youth in Indiana and across the country. "Gonzalez made sure the national advocates heard the 'voices from the Heartland."
In addition to his commitment to LGBT youth, he also worked with Latino youth at the Hispanic Center, Gays and Lesbians Working Against Violence and lobbied for an Indiana hate crimes bill.

He is buried alongside his partner at Crown Hill Cemetery in Indianapolis.

See also
Chris Gonzalez Library and Archives

References

External links
 Indiana Youth Group

1963 births
1994 deaths
Burials at Crown Hill Cemetery
Franklin College (Indiana) alumni
LGBT people from Indiana
LGBT Hispanic and Latino American people
AIDS-related deaths in Indiana
People from Griffith, Indiana
20th-century American LGBT people